Eunectes is a genus of boas found in tropical South America commonly called anacondas. They are a semiaquatic group of snakes and include one of the largest snakes in the world, E. murinus, the green anaconda. Four species are currently recognized.

Origin 
The recent fossil record of Eunectes is relatively sparse compared to other vertebrates and other genera of snakes. The fossil record of the this group is effected by an artifact called the Pull of the Recent.  Fossils of recent ancestors are not known, so the living species ‘pull’ the historical range of the genus to the present.

Etymology

Distribution and habitat
Found in tropical South America from Ecuador, Brazil, Colombia and Venezuela south to Argentina.

Feeding
All four species are aquatic snakes that prey on other aquatic animals, including fish, river fowl, and caiman. Videos exist of anacondas preying on domestic animals such as goats and sometimes even jaguars that venture too close to the water.

Relationship with humans
While encounters between people and anacondas may be dangerous, they do not regularly hunt humans. Nevertheless, threat from anacondas is a familiar trope in comics, movies and adventure stories set in the Amazon jungle. Local communities and some European explorers have given accounts of giant anacondas, legendary snakes of much greater proportion than any confirmed specimen.

Although charismatic, there is little known on the biology of wild anacondas. Most of our knowledge comes from the work of Dr. Jesús A. Rivas and his team working in the Venezuelan llanos.

Species

Mating system
The mating seasons in Eunectes varies both between species and within species depending on locality, although the trend appears to be the dry season. The green anaconda (E. murinus) is the most well-studied species of Eunectes in terms of their mating system, followed by the yellow anaconda (E. notaeus); unfortunately E. deschauenseei and E. beniensis are much less common, making the specific details of their mating systems less well understood.

Sexual dimorphism
Sexual size dimorphism in Eunectes is the opposite of most other vertebrates. This size difference has several benefits for both sexes. Large size in females leads to higher fecundity and larger offspring; as a result male mate choice favours larger females. Large size is also favoured in males because larger males tend to be more successful at reproducing, both because of their size advantage in endurance rivalry and their advantage in sperm competition because larger males are able to produce more sperm. One reason that males are so much smaller in Eunectes is that large males can be confused for females, which interferes with their ability to mate when smaller males mistakenly coil them in breeding balls; as a result, there is an optimum size for males where they are large enough to successfully compete, but not large enough to risk other males trying to mate with them.

Breeding balls
During the mating season female anacondas release pheromones to attract males for breeding, which can result in polyandrous breeding balls; these breeding balls have been observed in E. murinus, E. notaeus, and E. deschauenseei, and likely also occur in E. beniensis. In the green anaconda (E. murinus) up to 13 males have been observed in a breeding ball, which have been recorded to last two weeks on average. In anaconda breeding balls, several males coil around one female and attempt to position themselves as close to her cloaca as possible where they use their pelvic spurs to "tickle" and encourage her to allow penetration. Since there are often many males present and only one male can mate with the female at a time, the success of a male often depends on his persistence and endurance, because physical combat is not a part of the Eunectes mating ritual, apart from firmly pushing against other males in an attempt to secure the best position on the female.

Sexual cannibalism

Cannibalism is quite easy in anacondas since females are so much larger than males, but sexual cannibalism has only been confirmed in E. murinus. Females gain the direct benefit of a post-copulatory high-protein meal when they consume their mates, along with the indirect benefit of additional resources to use for the formation of offspring; cannibalism in general (outside of the breeding season) has been confirmed in all but E. deschauenseei, although it is likely that it occurs in all Eunectes species.

Asexual reproduction
Although sexual reproduction is by far the most common in Eunectes, E. murinus has been observed to undergo facultative parthenogenesis. In both cases, the females had lived in isolation from other anacondas for over eight years, and DNA analysis showed that the few fully formed offspring were genetically identical to the mothers; although this is not commonly observed, it is likely possible in all species of Eunectes and several other species of Boidae.

References

Further reading

External links

 

 
Snakes of South America
Reptiles of Trinidad and Tobago
Snake genera
Taxa named by Johann Georg Wagler